Renat Zaytunovich Gafurov (born October 8 1982) is a former motorcycle speedway rider from Russia, who was a member of Russia national team.

Career
Gafurov won 2009 Individual European Championship and is a two times Russian champion.

Honours 
 Speedway World Cup
 2003 - 8th place (5th place in Race-off
 2004 - 7th place (4th place in Event 1
 2007 - 6th place (4th place in Race-off
 2008 - 6th place (4th place in Race-off
 Individual European Championship
 2004 -  Holsted - 7th place (8 points)
 2005 -  Lonigo - 6th place (10 points)
 2007 - 11th place in Semi-Final A
 2009 -  Tolyatti - European Champion (13 pts + 1st)
 Individual U-19 European Championship
 2000 -  Ljubljana - 8th place (8 points)
 2001 -  Pardubice - 16th place (1 point)
 European Pairs Championship
 2004 -  Debrecen - Silver medal (13 points)
 2007 -  Terenzano - Bronze medal (12 points)
 2008 -  Natschbach-Loipersbach - Bronze medal (13 points)
 European Club Champions' Cup
 2001 -  Daugavpils - Silver medal (4 points)
 2009 -  Toruń - 3rd place (11 pts) Vladivostok

See also 
 Russia national speedway team

References 

1982 births
Living people
Russian speedway riders
Individual Speedway European Champions
Naturalized citizens of Poland
Oxford Cheetahs riders
Sportspeople from Bashkortostan